"Whatever Happened, Happened" is the 11th television episode of the fifth season of ABC's Lost. The 97th episode of the show overall, "Whatever Happened, Happened" aired April 1, 2009, on ABC in the United States. The episode was written by executive producers/show runners Damon Lindelof & Carlton Cuse and directed by "The Man Behind the Curtain" director Bobby Roth.

In 1977, Kate Austen (Evangeline Lilly) goes to extreme measures to save young Benjamin Linus (Sterling Beaumon) when Jack Shephard (Matthew Fox) refuses to help. In flashbacks, Kate takes care of Sawyer's (Josh Holloway) favor and begins to tell the truth to protect Aaron (William Blanchette).

Plot

Flashbacks
Shortly after the Oceanic six's rescue, Kate Austen and a baby Aaron visit Cassidy, who is an ex-girlfriend of James "Sawyer" Ford. Kate gives Cassidy and Sawyer's daughter Clementine (Olivia Vickery) money from the severance pay from Oceanic. Cassidy deduces that Aaron is not Kate's baby, prompting her to tell her the truth about everything that happened on the island. Cassidy eventually leads Kate to realize that the reason she took Aaron as her own, is because Kate needed him in order to get over her emotional attachment to Sawyer. After the survivors's confrontation with Ben, Kate momentarily loses Aaron in a supermarket. She recovers it from a woman who bears a strong resemblance of Claire Littleton (Emilie de Ravin), Aaron's mother. After this, she decides to return to the island with the others who left. She leaves Aaron in the care of Carole Littleton (Susan Duerden), Aaron's biological grandmother. Kate also tells Carole that she is returning to the island to find Carole's daughter, Claire, and bring her home.

1977
After Sayid shoots a young Ben, Jin-Soo Kwon (Daniel Dae Kim) wakes up and notices the situation. He brings Ben to the barracks so that his injuries can be treated by Juliet Burke (Elizabeth Mitchell). Juliet is unable to perform the necessary surgery on Ben and sends James "Sawyer" Ford (Josh Holloway) to retrieve Jack Shephard (Matthew Fox), a spinal surgeon. Meanwhile, Hugo "Hurley" Reyes (Jorge Garcia) and Miles Straume (Ken Leung) debate the nature of time travel. Hurley is convinced that they have changed the past, as in Back to the Future, but Miles tells him that these events always happened in the past. Hurley, however, points that an older Ben didn't recognize Sayid when he was tortured in 2004, as the man who shot him as a kid. Jack, knowing what Ben does in the future, refuses to help, saying that "he already saved him once". This drives Kate Austen (Evangeline Lilly) to do everything she can to help Ben.

Kate goes to the sick bay where Ben is being treated and donates her blood because she is a universal donor. She strikes up a conversation with Ben's father, Roger (Jon Gries), who is upset that Ben stole his keys and freed Sayid from the jail. Once it becomes clear that Ben will succumb to his injuries without further intervention, Kate decides to take Ben to the Others, the island's native population. Sawyer comes to Kate's aid and they bring Ben to Richard Alpert (Nestor Carbonell), who warns them that if he treats Ben, he will not remember what has happened and will never be the same again. They agree anyway. Another Other urges Richard to inform "Ellie" of his intentions and implies that "Charles" will not be pleased if he finds out, but Richard says he doesn't answer to either of them. Richard then carries Ben into the temple.

2007
After being knocked out unconscious by Sun, Ben (Michael Emerson) wakes up in the infirmary, and is greeted by John Locke (Terry O'Quinn), who welcomes him back to "the land of the living".

Notes

References

External links
"Whatever Happened, Happened" at ABC

Lost (season 5) episodes
2009 American television episodes
Television episodes directed by Bobby Roth
Television episodes written by Damon Lindelof